Musgrave is a civil parish in the Eden District of Cumbria, England.  It has a population of 152, and contains the villages of Little Musgrave and Great Musgrave. At the 2011 Census, data for Helbeck was included with Musgrave giving a total population of 165.

See also

Listed buildings in Musgrave, Cumbria

References

External links
 Cumbria County History Trust: Musgrave (nb: provisional research only – see Talk page)

Civil parishes in Cumbria